The Vortex (previously known as Turn of the Century and Corkscrew) is a corkscrew roller coaster in Calaway Park in Alberta, Canada.

When it opened, it was named "Turn of the Century" and was painted an "earth tone" brown to blend in with the surrounding landscape. In 1986, it was renamed "Corkscrew". In the 2004 off-season, the track and supports were painted green, and the coaster train was painted pink. During this time it was renamed "Vortex" with the new catchphrase "Fun From The Bottom Of Your Stomach". This update debuted when the park opened for the 2005 season. The update was for Alberta's centennial.

In the 2019 off-season, Vortex was repainted by Baynum Painting to a green and purple color scheme. The coaster train remains the same pink color. 

Vortex, unlike most roller coasters similar in size, sends riders around for two laps rather than one to accommodate for the short track length.

References 

1982 establishments in Alberta
Rocky View County
Roller coasters in Alberta
Roller coasters introduced in 1982
Steel roller coasters